Odd Harald Johansen (born 18 August 1982) is a Norwegian politician for the Labour Party.

He served as a deputy representative to the Norwegian Parliament from Troms during the term 2005–2009.

On the local level he is a deputy member of Karlsøy municipality council.

References

1982 births
Living people
Deputy members of the Storting
Labour Party (Norway) politicians
Troms politicians
Place of birth missing (living people)
21st-century Norwegian politicians